God Speed is the 11th album by Masami Okui, released on 24 February 2006.

Track listing
Wild Cat
Lyrics: Masami Okui
Composition: IPPEI
Arrangement: Nils
Subliminal
Lyrics: Masami Okui
Composition, arrangement: Monta
God Speed
Lyrics: Masami Okui
Composition: Monta
Arrangement: Hideyuki Daichi Suzuki

DVD Drama RAY theme song
Lyrics, composition: Masami Okui
Arrangement: Monta
Red
Lyrics, composition: Masami Okui
Arrangement: Shunsuke Suzuki
Last Sun
Lyrics: Masami Okui
Composition, arrangement: Hiroshi Uesugi
Timeliness
Lyrics: Masami Okui
Composition: Daiju Takato, Masami Okui
Arrangement: Daiju Takato
Paradise Lost
Lyrics: Masami Okui
Composition, arrangement: Macaroni
Pride
Lyrics, composition: Masami Okui
Arrangement: Monta
Gift
 DVD Drama Gift theme song
 Lyrics, composition: Masami Okui
 Arrangement: Takahito Eguchi

Lyrics: Masami Okui
Composition, arrangement: Macaroni
Trust (Session Mix)
 anime television series He Is My Master opening song
 Lyrics, composition: Masami Okui
 Arrangement: Seikou Nagaoka, Daiju Takato

Sources
Official website: Makusonia

2006 albums
Masami Okui albums